XHRAW-FM is a radio station on 93.9 FM in Ciudad Miguel Alemán, Tamaulipas, Mexico.

History
XHRAW received its concession on November 30, 1994 as XHCDL-FM. It was owned by María Garza Acosta. The callsign was changed to the current XHRAW-FM on March 17, 1998, and the station was sold to Rolando Ramiro González Treviño in 2000.

In 2017, operation of XHRAW was transferred from Grupo AS, a regional Radiorama component, to Grupo Larsa Comunicaciones, which immediately instituted the Toño adult hits format, replacing the longtime La Poderosa imaging. That only lasted several months before a return to Fiesta Mexicana on February 20, 2018.

NRT took over operations itself in 2020. In November 2021, XHRAW adopted the La Mejor grupera format from MVS Radio.

References

Spanish-language radio stations
Radio stations in Tamaulipas